Mieczysław Michałowicz (10 September 1876 – 22 December 1965) was a Polish social and political activist, medical doctor of pediatrics, and professor of the Warsaw University.

Career
Michałowicz was born in Saint Petersburg, Russian Empire. He was an activist of the Polish Socialist Party, a rector of the Warsaw University from 1930 to 1931, and a member of the Polish Academy of Skills and Polish Academy of Sciences. He was a member of the Senate of Poland, first as a supporter of the sanacja regime, but later in opposition to it. He was one of the co-founders of the Democratic Party. During World War II he was imprisoned by the Germans; after the war decided to collaborate with the Polish communist Soviet-backed regime.

Further reading
 

1876 births
1965 deaths
Physicians from Warsaw
People from the Russian Empire of Polish descent
Polish Socialist Party politicians
Nonpartisan Bloc for Cooperation with the Government politicians
Camp of National Unity politicians
Alliance of Democrats (Poland) politicians
Senators of the Second Polish Republic (1935–1938)
Members of the State National Council
Members of the Polish Sejm 1947–1952
Polish pediatricians
Academic staff of the University of Warsaw
Commanders with Star of the Order of Polonia Restituta
Commanders of the Order of Polonia Restituta
Burials at Powązki Cemetery